Bernardino Cano Radil (29 November 1955 – 12 September 2021) was a Paraguayan politician and diplomat who served as a Deputy from 1989 to 1998 and later as the Ambassador to Cuba from 2015 until his death from COVID-19 in Havana on 12 September 2021.

References

1955 births
2021 deaths
Paraguayan politicians
Paraguayan diplomats
Deaths from the COVID-19 pandemic in Cuba
Ambassadors of Paraguay to Cuba
Colorado Party (Paraguay) politicians
Members of the Chamber of Deputies of Paraguay